Peter Craig Dutton (born 18 November 1970) is an Australian politician who has been leader of the opposition and leader of the Liberal Party since May 2022. He has represented the Queensland seat of Dickson in the House of Representatives since 2001 and held ministerial office in the Howard, Abbott, Turnbull and Morrison governments.

Dutton grew up in Brisbane. He worked as a police officer in the Queensland Police for nearly a decade upon leaving school, and later ran a construction business with his father. He joined the Liberal Party as a teenager and was elected to the House of Representatives at the 2001 election, aged 30. Following the 2004 election, he was appointed as Minister for Employment Participation. In January 2006, he was promoted to become Assistant Treasurer under Peter Costello. After the defeat of the Liberal-National Coalition at the 2007 election, he was appointed to the Shadow Cabinet as Shadow Minister for Health, a role he would hold for the next six years.

Upon the victory of the Coalition at the 2013 election, Dutton was appointed Minister for Health and Minister for Sport. He was moved to the role of Minister for Immigration and Border Protection in December 2014, where he played a key role in overseeing Operation Sovereign Borders. He was kept in that position after Malcolm Turnbull replaced Tony Abbott as Prime Minister in September 2015. In December 2017, he was also given the restored role of Minister for Home Affairs, heading a new 'super' department with broad responsibilities brought together from other existing departments. 

After the defeat of Abbott, Dutton became widely seen as the leader of the conservative faction in the Liberal Party, and began to be spoken of as a potential leader. In August 2018, after a period of poor opinion polling for the Coalition, Dutton unsuccessfully challenged Turnbull for the leadership. He then was defeated by Scott Morrison in a second leadership ballot days later after Turnbull chose to resign. He was retained as Minister for Home Affairs by Morrison, later becoming Minister for Defence and Leader of the House in March 2021. He went on to succeed Morrison as party leader unopposed after the Coalition's defeat at the 2022 election, becoming leader of the opposition. He is the first Liberal leader to come from Queensland, and the first leader since Alexander Downer to represent a seat outside of New South Wales.

Early years
Dutton was born on 18 November 1970 in the northern Brisbane suburb of Boondall. He is the eldest of five children, with one brother and three sisters. His mother Ailsa Leitch worked in childcare and his father Bruce Dutton was a builder. Dutton finished high school at the Anglican St Paul's School, Bald Hills. He is the great-great-grandson of the pastoralist squatter and politician Charles Boydell Dutton. He is also a descendant of Captain Richard James Coley, who was Queensland's first Sergeant-at-Arms, who built Brisbane's first private dwelling and who gave evidence confirming the mass poisonings of Aboriginal Australians at Kilcoy in 1842.

Dutton joined the Young Liberals in 1988 aged 18. He became the policy vice-chair of the Bayside Young Liberals the following year and chair of the branch in 1990. At the 1989 Queensland state election, the 19-year-old Dutton ran unsuccessfully as the Liberal candidate against Tom Burns, a former state Labor leader, in the safe Labor seat of Lytton.

Police career
Upon leaving high school, Dutton graduated from the Queensland Police Academy in 1990. He served as a Queensland Police officer for nearly a decade, working in the drug squad in Brisbane in the early 1990s. He also worked in the sex offenders squad and with the National Crime Authority.

In 1999, Dutton left the Queensland Police, having achieved the rank of detective senior constable. Documentation filed in the District Court of Queensland in 2000 describes his resignation as being prompted by a loss of driving confidence resulting from an incident in August 1998. He was driving an unmarked Mazda 626 during a covert surveillance operation, before rolling his car while in pursuit of an escaped prisoner who was driving erratically. Dutton also suffered numerous physical injuries during the accident, and as a result, was hospitalised briefly and bedridden for a week. He had sought damages of $250,000 from the escaped prisoner's insurance company but dropped the claim in 2005.

Business activities
On leaving the police, Dutton completed a Bachelor of Business at the Queensland University of Technology. He and his father founded the business Dutton Holdings, which was registered in 2000; it operated under six different trading and business names. The company bought, renovated, and converted buildings into childcare centres, and in 2002 it sold three childcare centres to the now defunct ABC Learning. ABC Learning continued to pay rent of A$100,000 to Dutton Holdings.  Dutton Holdings continues to trade under the name Dutton Building & Development.

Howard Government (2001–07)

Dutton was elected to the Division of Dickson at the 2001 election, defeating Labor's Cheryl Kernot. He was elevated to the ministry after the 2004 election as Minister for Workforce Participation, a position he held until January 2006. He was then appointed Assistant Treasurer and Minister for Revenue. He successfully retained Dickson at the 2007 election, which saw the government lose office. However, his margin was reduced to just 217 votes more than Labor's Fiona McNamara.

Opposition (2007–13)
Following the 2007 election, Dutton was promoted to shadow cabinet by the new Liberal leader Brendan Nelson, as Shadow Minister for Finance, Competition Policy and Deregulation. In 2008, he chose not to be present in the chamber during the apology to the Stolen Generations, which enjoyed bipartisan support. He said "I regarded it as something which was not going to deliver tangible outcomes to kids who are being raped and tortured in communities in the 21st century." Later, in a 2014 interview with the Sydney Morning Herald, Dutton said he regretted boycotting the apology: "I underestimated the symbolic and cultural significance of it."

In September 2008, Nelson was replaced as Liberal leader by Malcolm Turnbull, who appointed Dutton as Shadow Minister for Health and Ageing. He retained that position when Tony Abbott succeeded Turnbull as leader in December 2009. In June 2010, Dutton released the Coalition's mental health policy. The Australian described it as "the most significant announcement by any political party in relation to a targeted, evidence-based investment in mental health", but not all experts agreed.

Dutton retained his seat with a positive swing at the 2010 federal election, despite an unfavourable redistribution. In the lead-up to the 2013 federal election, he announced a range of Coalition health policies, which were received favourably by industry groups. The Australian Medical Association said "the Coalition has delivered a strong package of practical, affordable health policies that would strengthen general practice", while Cancer Council Australia said that "Dutton's promise to finalise the bowel cancer screening program by 2020 would save an additional 35,000 lives over the next 40 years."

Attempted seat shift
As the 2010 election approached, it looked like Dutton would lose to the Labor candidate due to a redistribution of division boundaries that had erased his majority and made Dickson notionally Labor. To safeguard himself, Dutton sought pre-selection for the merged Liberal National Party in the safe Liberal seat of McPherson on the Gold Coast (despite not living in or near McPherson). Some constituents complained, "The abandoning of a seat by a sitting MP halfway through a parliamentary term to contest pre-selection in a seat over 100 kilometres to the south is not looked upon favourably."

Dutton lost the McPherson pre-selection to Karen Andrews, reportedly due to misgivings from former Nationals in the area. He then asked the LNP to "deliver him a seat for which he does not have to fight other preselection candidates." Liberal MP Alex Somlyay (the chief Opposition whip of the time) said that Dutton's expectation of an uncontested preselection was "unusual." When the state executive did not provide Dutton an unchallenged preselection, Dutton reluctantly returned to campaign for the seat of Dickson. In the election, he won the seat with a 5.9% swing towards him.

Cabinet Minister (2013–22)

Minister for Health 
Dutton retained his seat at the 2013 election. He was appointed to the new ministry by Prime Minister Tony Abbott as Minister for Health and Minister for Sport.

As Health Minister, Dutton announced the $20 billion Medical Research Future Fund. As announced, the capital and any ongoing capital gains of the Medical Research Future Fund will be preserved in perpetuity.

Under Dutton, projected funding in the health portfolio increased in the 2014–15 Budget to $66.9 billion, an increase of 7.5 percent from $62.2 billion in 2012–13, the final full year of the Labor Government. Projected expenditure on Medicare increased over 9.5 percent from $18.5 billion in 2012–13 under Labor to a projected $20.32 billion in 2014–15 under Dutton. Funding for public hospital services increased by nearly 14 percent under Dutton in the 2014–15 Budget to a projected $15.12 billion compared to $13.28 billion in the last full year of the Labor Government in 2012–13.

In a 2015 poll by Australian Doctor magazine, based on votes from over 1,100 doctors, Dutton was voted the worst health minister in the last 35 years by 46 percent of respondents.

Minister for Immigration (2014–17) 

On 23 December 2014, Dutton was sworn in as the Minister for Immigration and Border Protection after a cabinet
reshuffle. In September 2015, Dutton cancelled the visa of anti-abortion activist Troy Newman, over remarks in his 2000 book Their Blood Cries Out.
In 2016, News Corp Sunday political editor Samantha Maiden wrote a column critical of Jamie Briggs. Dutton drafted a text message to Briggs describing Maiden as a "mad fucking witch" but inadvertently sent it to Maiden. Maiden accepted an apology from Dutton.

Illiterate refugee comments
Before the 2016 election Dutton said of refugees "many ... won't be numerate or literate in their own language let alone English", and "These people would be taking Australian jobs". Turnbull defended Dutton by stating he is an "outstanding Immigration Minister". Against a statewide swing against the government of 2.9 points, Dutton's margin fell from 6.7 to 1.6 points, leaving him with a margin of fewer than 3,000 votes against Labor candidate Linda Lavarch.

Sarah Hanson-Young spying incident 
On 5 June 2015, Dutton denied claims made by Greens Senator Sarah Hanson-Young that she was spied on during a visit to Nauru. At the same time he called into question her credibility saying "I have evidence that Senator Hanson-Young over-states every issue. She gets her facts wrong most of the time. And I just think you need to look at it in the light of experience with Senator Hanson-Young. If she's got evidence, produce it." He also claimed that "What Sarah Hanson-Young is about is publicity. She loves the camera and she loves to see her own name in the paper. That's the start and finish of Sarah Hanson-Young." Hanson-Young responded that "Peter Dutton can attack and insult me as much as he likes, but nothing will change the fact that my work has revealed systemic child abuse and the rape of young women on Nauru under his watch." The spying claims were later confirmed by the Immigration Department and Wilson Security who carried out the spying operation.

Au pair cases

In June 2015, an au pair who was detained at Brisbane Airport made a phone call and had her tourist visa reinstated. In November, in a second case, Dutton granted a visa to another au pair, despite his department warning him that she was at risk of breaching her work conditions on her tourist visa. Dutton indicated that he knew neither tourist. In August 2018, Roman Quaedvlieg indicated that he had personal knowledge of one of the cases, and was seeking to correct Hansard if it did not match his knowledge. A third au pair was granted a visa due to lobbying by AFL chief Gillon McLachlan, she was due to stay with his relative Callum Maclachlan. Dutton's department again warned him there were indications that she was intending to work for Callum's family. A Senate inquiry into two of the cases published a report on 11 September 2018. It recommended "that the Senate consider censuring the Minister for Home Affairs (the Hon Peter Dutton MP) ... for failing to observe fairness in making official decisions as required by the Statement of Ministerial Standards."

Rising seas joke 
On 11 September 2015, Dutton was overheard on an open microphone, before a community meeting on Syrian refugees, joking about rising sea levels in the Pacific Islands, saying "Time doesn't mean anything when you're about to have water lapping at your door". Dutton initially refused to apologise, saying it was a private conversation, but later apologised. The Foreign Minister of
the Marshall Islands at the time, Tony deBrum, responded by writing "insensitivity knows no bounds in the big polluting island down [south]" and the "Next time waves are battering my home [and] my
kids are scared, I will ask Peter Dutton to come over, and he is still probably laughing,"

Comments on Lebanese immigration 
In November 2016, Dutton said it was a mistake by the Malcolm Fraser administration to have admitted Lebanese Muslim immigrants. Foreign Minister Julie Bishop said Dutton was making a specific point about those charged with terrorism offences. "He made it quite clear that he respects and appreciates the contribution that the Lebanese community make in Australia."

Manus Island 
On 15 April 2017 shots were fired by the Papua New Guinea defence force into the Manus Island Detention Centre. Dutton responded saying "There was difficulty, as I understand it, in the community. There was an alleged incident where three asylum seekers were alleged to be leading a local five-year old boy back toward the facility and there was a lot of angst around that, if you like, within the local PNG community." "I think there was concern about why the boy was being led or for what purpose he was being led away back into the regional processing centre. So I think it's fair to say that the mood had elevated quite quickly. I think some of the local residents were quite angry about this particular incident and another alleged sexual assault."

However, the regional police commander on Manus Island said a young boy who was 10, not five, had gone to the centre two weeks earlier to ask for food. He said "It's a total separate incident altogether" The Greens senator Nick McKim said Dutton had been caught telling an outrageous lie. "This has disturbing echoes of the children overboard affair lies."

On 31 October 2017, the Papuan Government closed down the Manus Island regional processing centre. However, 600 men residing in the processing centre refused to be moved to alternative accommodation in the town of Lorengau and staged a protest. Dutton defended the closure of the processing centre and asserted that the Papuan authorities had given notice of the camp's impending closure in May 2017. He also rejected Australian Greens Senator Nick McKim's report that there was no safe alternative accommodation available as false and claimed McKim was inciting trouble. Following a prolonged standoff with Papuan security forces, the remaining men were evacuated, many forcibly, to new accommodation. Arrangements have been made to resettle an unspecified number of the asylum seekers in the United States. The others will be moved to either a different part of Papua New Guinea or a different country.

In mid-November 2017, Dutton rejected an offer by the newly-elected New Zealand Prime Minister Jacinda Ardern to resettle 150 asylum seekers from the Manus Island detention centre in New Zealand and warned that it would have repercussions for the two countries' bilateral relations. He also claimed that New Zealand's offer would encourage people smugglers. Dutton also criticised a New Zealand offer to provide $3 million for services for asylum seekers on Manus and Nauru as a "waste of money" that could be spent elsewhere, such as displaced people in Indonesia. In addition, Dutton criticised Australia's Opposition Leader Bill Shorten's call for Australia to accept the New Zealand offer as an attempt to appease the Labor Left with "cheap political stunts and mealy-mouthed words".

Minister for Home Affairs (2017–2021) 

On 20 December 2017, Dutton was appointed the Minister for Home Affairs with responsibilities of overseeing the Department of Home Affairs which was established on 20 December 2017 by Administrative Arrangement Order. The Home Affairs portfolio is a major re-arrangement of national security, law enforcement, emergency management, transport security, border control, and immigration functions.

South African farm attacks 

In March 2018, Dutton made calls to treat white South African farmers as refugees, stating that "they need help from a civilised country". However, his offer was rejected by Afrikaner rights organisation AfriForum, which stated that the future of Afrikaners was in Africa, as well as by the survivalist group the Suidlanders, which took credit for bringing the issue of a purported "white genocide" to international attention and for Dutton's decision, and was met with "regret" by the South African foreign ministry. The Australian High Commissioner was subsequently summoned by the South African foreign ministry, which expressed its offence at Dutton's statements, and demanded a "full retraction".

His proposal got support from some of his party's backbenchers and Liberal Democrat Senator David Leyonhjelm with Leyonhjelm later clarifying that he thought that South African farmers should be admitted under existing visa programmes, and could not be regarded as refugees. National Party of Australia MP Andrew Broad warned that the mass migration of South African farmers would result in food shortages in South Africa. Economic Freedom Fighters leader Julius Malema encouraged white farmers to take up Dutton's offer. After initially leaving the door open to changes, Australian Foreign Minister Julie Bishop subsequently ruled out any special deals for white South African farmers, emphasising the non-discriminatory nature of Australia's humanitarian visa programme. In a subsequent interview, Dutton vowed to push forward with his plans, saying that his critics were "dead to me".

In April 2018, it emerged that Dutton's department had previously blocked asylum applications by a white farmer, and another white South African woman, with the decisions upheld by the Administrative Appeals Tribunal.

Immigration from New Zealand 

As both Immigration Minister and Home Affairs Minister, Peter Dutton has defended an amendment to the Migration Act 1958 that facilitates the denial or cancellation of Australian visas for non-citizens on "character" grounds. This stringent "character test" also affects non-citizens who have lived most of their lives in Australia or who have families living in the country. New Zealand nationals living in Australia were disproportionately affected by this "character test" with over 1,300 New Zealanders having been deported from Australia in the period between January 2015 and July 2018. According to a Home Affairs Department report, 620 New Zealanders had their visas cancelled on character grounds in 2017 alone.

In July 2017, Dutton's Department of Immigration and Border Protection introduced a special Skilled Independent subclass 189 visa to provide a pathway for New Zealanders holding a Special Category Visa to acquire Australian citizenship. The visa requires NZ nationals to have held a Special Category Visa for five years and to maintain an annual income of $53,900. Between 60,000 and 80,000 New Zealanders residing in Australia are eligible for the Skilled Independent subclass 189 visa. By February 2018, 1,512 skilled independent visas had been issued by late February 2018 with another 7,500 visas still being processed. The Skilled Independent subclass 189 visa was criticised by Australian Greens Senator Nick McKim as a stealth means of favouring "English-speaking, white and wealthy" migrants.

In February 2018, Dutton used his discretionary powers as Minister of Home Affairs to deport New Zealander Caleb Maraku on the grounds that he breached the "character test" provision of the Migration Act 1958. Maraku had been sentenced to 12 months probation for committing a one punch attack on another youth in Queensland's Gold Coast in November 2017. Maraku's perceive lenient sentencing and insensitive behaviour following his sentence had drawn substantial media and public attention, including a 50,000 strong petition calling for his deportation. In response to Maraku's case, Dutton stated: 

In early July 2018, Dutton ordered the deportation of controversial New Zealand Baptist Pastor Logan Robertson, who had disrupted services at two mosques in Kuraby and Darra in Brisbane. Dutton approved Robertson's visa cancellation on the grounds that he had violated the conditions of his visa, stating that "we have a wonderful tradition in our country of freedom of speech, but we're not going to tolerate people going to a place of worship and harassing others." Robertson had early drawn controversy in New Zealand for his homophobic remarks and opposition to same-sex marriage.

In mid-July 2018, Dutton's immigration "character test" became the subject of a controversial Australian Broadcasting Corporation documentary, entitled "Don't Call Australia Home", focusing on New Zealanders who had been deported from Australia. In response, Dutton issued a tweet defending his deportation policy and claiming that deporting 184 "bikies" saved Australia A$116 million. In response, the New Zealand Minister of Justice Andrew Little, who also appeared in the documentary, criticised Australia's deportation laws for lacking "humanitarian ideals." The documentary's release also coincided with the release of a 17-year-old New Zealand youth from an Australian detention centre, which had caused friction between the two governments. In response, Dutton defended his Government's policy of deporting non-citizen criminals and chastised New Zealand for not contributing enough to assist Australian naval patrols intercepting the "people smugglers."

In mid-July 2019, Dutton defended Australia's right to deport criminal non-citizens in response to concerns raised by the visiting New Zealand Prime Minister Jacinda Ardern, stating:  In response, Professor Patrick Keyzer and Dave Martin of La Trobe University criticized Dutton's pedophilia remarks as misleading and contended that most deportees from Australia had spent most of their lives in Australia and had little ties to New Zealand.

Anchor baby comments 
In September 2019, Dutton called the two children of the Biloela family "anchor babies."

Protests 
In October and November 2019, Dutton expressed his views on protesters and police response. He stated that when protesters break the law "There needs to be mandatory or minimum sentences imposed... A community expectation is that these people are heavily fined or jailed." He also agreed with an on-air statement made by conservative 2GB radio presenter Ray Hadley that protesters should not receive social security payments. Leader of the Australian Greens Richard Di Natale responded by saying that "Peter Dutton doesn’t know what living in a democracy means" and claimed that he's "starting to sound more like a dictator than he is an elected politician. Because somebody says something that he doesn’t like, that he doesn’t support, he’s saying we’re going to strip away income support."

In November 2019, Dutton said that the States should make protesters pay for the cost of police response to demonstrations. He said of protesters: "For many of them they don't even believe in democracy... These people are completely against our way of life. These people can protest peacefully, as many people do, but the disruption that they seek to cause, the disharmony that they seek to sow within our society is unacceptable."

Policing 
In December 2019, Dutton announced that airport security measures were to be increased to detect, deter and respond to potential threats to aviation safety. Measures include greater use of canines and the deployment of extra protective services personnel armed with MK18 short-barreled rifles. Dutton appeared in a video alongside police personnel to announce the policy, sparking criticism of the potential use of police for political purposes.

In March 2019, the Australian Federal Police Association had claimed that the AFP should be removed from the Department of Home Affairs to preserve its integrity and its ability to carry out investigations without government influence. Association president Angela Smith described it as "an embarrassing situation... We look the least independent police force in Australia, surely the other police forces are laughing at us."

Leadership challenges

On 21 August 2018, Prime Minister Malcolm Turnbull called a snap ballot of the leadership of the Liberal Party following several days of feverish leadership speculation, of which Dutton was at the centre. Dutton responded to Turnbull's ballot call by formally challenging for the leadership of the party and won 35 of 83 votes available, 7 short of a majority. Dutton then resigned from the Ministry despite being offered by Turnbull to retain his position of Minister for Home Affairs, and the media speculated that Dutton and his conservative backers in the party were likely to challenge for the leadership again in the near future. Three days later, Dutton called for another leadership spill, and Malcolm Turnbull tendered his resignation to the Governor-General. Dutton was defeated by Treasurer and Acting Home Affairs Minister Scott Morrison by 45 votes to 40.

Doubts surrounding Dutton's eligibility to be elected to parliament emerged on the grounds of section 44(v) of the Australian Constitution, as the family trust owned by Dutton operated a child care centre that received over $5.6 million in funding from the Commonwealth Government, in a situation similar to Bob Day's case. Although Dutton had received legal advice stating that he was not in breach of section 44(v), Labor had received contrary advice; at Turnbull's request, the Attorney-General referred the matter to the Solicitor-General. On 23 August, Labor attempted to move a motion to refer Dutton's eligibility as an MP to the High Court, in a similar manner to referrals made during the recent parliamentary citizenship crisis. The motion failed by 69 votes to 68. On 24 August, the Solicitor-General advised that in terms of section 44(v) Dutton was "not incapable" of sitting as an MP, although he added that he had been provided with limited factual information and that, owing to differences of judicial opinion in earlier decisions of the High Court on section 44(v), Dutton's legal position could not be entirely clear without a referral to the High Court.
Dutton was reappointed to his former Home Affairs portfolio by Scott Morrison in the Morrison Ministry; however, responsibility for Immigration was stripped from the role and was assigned to David Coleman.

2019 federal election
Dutton was re-elected at the 2019 federal election. The political think tank GetUp! identified Dutton as "Australia's most unwanted hard-right politician" after surveying more than "30,000 members". GetUp! mounted a campaign in an attempt to defeat Dutton in Dickson. In response, Dutton said GetUp! was, "deceptive", "undemocratic" and "unrepresentative" and that he would back "parliamentary processes to bring the activist group to heel." GetUp! has defended the effectiveness of its campaigning in Dutton's electorate.

Minister for Defence (2021–22) 

In March 2021, Dutton was appointed Minister for Defence. On 21 May 2021, Dutton directed the department and serving military personnel to stop pursuing a "woke agenda", and cease holding events to mark the International Day Against Homophobia, Biphobia, Interphobia and Transphobia where staff wore rainbow clothing.

On 11 July 2021, Dutton announced the end of Australia's military presence in Afghanistan.

In October 2021, Dutton said Australia will back up any U.S. effort to defend Taiwan if China attacks. In November 2021, he branded the former Prime Minister Paul Keating as "Grand Appeaser Comrade Keating".

Defamation Case 
On 16 June 2021, in the Federal Court, Justice Richard White ordered Dutton to attend mediation over a defamation suit he brought against refugee activist, Shane Bazzi over a tweet calling him a "rape apologist".  In August 2020, it was announced this mediation had failed.

On 24 November 2021, White ruled in Dutton's favour and awarded $35,000 in defamation damages, but refused Dutton’s bid for an injunction to prevent Bazzi tweeting about him.

This decision was overturned on 17 May 2022 by the Full Court of the Federal Court, which found that the words "rape apologist", taken in the context of the whole message together with the Guardian article to which it was linked, referred to Dutton's attitude not to rape itself but toward claims of having been raped and accordingly did not amount to defamation.

Leader of the Opposition (2022–present) 

The Coalition was defeated at the 2022 federal election, with Dutton retaining his seat despite a swing against him. After Scott Morrison resigned as leader of the Liberal Party, Dutton was elected unopposed as the new leader, with Sussan Ley elected as deputy.

In parliament, in December 2022, Dutton repeatedly, after multiple corrections, referred incorrectly to Sharon Claydon as "Mr Speaker".

Political views

Dutton is aligned with the "National Right" faction of the Liberal Party, which he leads. He has been described as a right-wing populist. Dutton is opposed to an Australian republic. In December 2018, Dutton told Sky News that for the prior seventeen years he had regarded "parliament as a disadvantage for sitting governments".

African "gang violence" comments
In January 2018, Dutton said that people in Melbourne are scared of going out because of "gang violence" involving African Australians, but was "ridiculed" for it by people who live in Melbourne.

Negative gearing
Dutton opposes any changes to negative gearing which offers tax breaks to property investors, saying in May 2017 that changing it would harm the economy. He owns six properties with his wife, including a shopping centre in Townsville.

Pledge of Allegiance
In 2018, Dutton said he supports Australian school kids taking the Oath of Allegiance in schools, as is done by new Australian citizens.

Legalisation of cannabis
Dutton is against the legalisation of cannabis, and has described it as a "gateway drug" in June 2021. After the Australian Capital Territory (ACT) decriminalised the recreational use of cannabis in September 2019, Dutton condemned the new laws as "unconscionable", "trendy", and "dangerous".

Same-sex marriage
Dutton opposes same-sex marriage. In March 2017, it was reported in The Sydney Morning Herald that Dutton "said privately it was inevitable that same-sex marriage would become law in Australia so it would be better for the Coalition, rather than Labor, to control the process". Dutton's actions publicly have been in opposition to same-sex advocates. In March 2017, 31 CEOs signed a letter to Prime Minister Malcolm Turnbull calling for a free vote in the Australian Parliament on same-sex marriage. In response to this letter, on 16 March, Dutton said that the CEOs "shouldn't shove their views down our throats" and that CEOs who were "doing the wrong thing" should "be publicly shamed". Dutton repeated his criticism at a speech to the LNP State Council in Queensland on 18 March. The Herald then reported that "the forcefulness of Mr Dutton's attack on corporate chief executives last weekin which he told them to "stick to their knitting"has aroused suspicion among some colleagues who believed he was committed to achieving a breakthrough on [same-sex marriage]". The following month, The Daily Telegraph reported that Dutton was asked by a lesbian for clarification on his position, and he "told her he had been clear that he was against same-sex marriage". In his political career, Dutton has voted "very strongly against same sex marriage"; however, he voted in favour of the Marriage Amendment (Definition and Religious Freedoms) Act 2017, which legalised same-sex marriage in Australia; 65 percent of his constituency voted "Yes" in the Australian Marriage Law Postal Survey.

Dutton's comments were heavily criticised as an attempt to censor expressions of support for same-sex marriage, with some commenters also accusing him of hypocrisy given his support for changing Section 18C of the Racial Discrimination Act 1975. Former New South Wales Premier Kristina Keneally said that according to Dutton, "Free speech is great and should be expanded, unless it's an Australian corporate CEO speaking about same-sex marriage. Then they need to shut up." Liberal MPs and ministers Julie Bishop and Simon Birmingham also expressed disagreement with Dutton's comments.

On 9 May 2017, a 67-year-old man pushed a pie into the face of Qantas CEO Alan Joyce while Joyce was speaking at a function in Perth. The next day, the assailant confirmed that the attack was to protest against Joyce's support for same-sex marriage. Dutton had singled out Joyce in his criticism of pro-same-sex marriage CEOs, leading some LGBTI advocates to hold him partially responsible for the attack. Dutton condemned the attack on Twitter.

On 28 September 2017, following the news that US rapper Macklemore would sing a pro-marriage equality song at the NRL Grand Final, Dutton said in the name of free speech that "two songs should be played, one for gay marriage and one against gay marriage".

South African farmers 
Dutton has been accused of supporting and promoting the white genocide myth, especially in relation to the South African farm attacks. In 2018, amid pressure by the South African Australian community for a special immigration intake for their family members, he declared that Afrikaners required refugee status in Australia because of the high level of violent crime in South Africa and "the horrific circumstances they face" in South Africa. BBC News reported that the Suidlanders group's "message of white genocide" had "resonated" with Dutton, prompting him to offer fast-track visas to white South African farmers due to their being "persecuted", claiming they needed help from a "civilised" country. Australian Greens leader Richard Di Natale labelled the process of bringing white South African farmers to Australia as thoroughly racist. He also said that it would restore a semblance of policy similar to that enacted under the White Australia Policy.

Personal life
Dutton married his first wife when he was 22 years of age; the marriage ended after a few months. His eldest child, a daughter, was born in 2002 to another partner, and split time between her parents in a shared parenting arrangement. In 2003, Dutton married his second wife, Kirilly, with whom he has two sons.

On 13 March 2020, Dutton announced that he had tested positive for COVID-19, becoming one of the first high-profile cases of the pandemic in Australia.

Dutton suffers from the skin condition alopecia totalis.

Electoral performance

Notes

References

External links 

 Personal homepage
 

|-

|-

|-

|-

|-

|-

|-

|-

|-

1970 births
21st-century Australian politicians
Abbott Government
Australian Ministers for Health
Australian monarchists
Australian police officers
Government ministers of Australia
Leaders of the Liberal Party of Australia
Liberal National Party of Queensland members of the Parliament of Australia
Liberal Party of Australia members of the Parliament of Australia
Living people
Members of the Australian House of Representatives for Dickson
Members of the Cabinet of Australia
Australian Leaders of the Opposition
Morrison Government
Defence ministers of Australia
Leaders of the Australian House of Representatives
Queensland University of Technology alumni
Turnbull Government